is a series of English language study aids published by SansaiBooks in Japan. Targeted at otaku, it attempted to teach English words using examples drawn from computer games and anime.

In the reprint of the first Moetan book and the bath towel sold during Comic Market 69, "MOETAN" stands for 'Methodology Of English, The Academic Necessity'. The acronym may have been chosen as a play on combining the words moé and -tan, both terms of cuteness used in relation to girl characters in anime, to create a portmanteauic double meaning.

Moeru Eitango Moetan
Moeru Eitango Moetan (萌える英単語 もえたん), also known as The Moetan Wordbook, is the first in the Moetan series, published in 2003.

Each chapter consists of a short story, written in pure Japanese, concerning the adventures of "Nao-kun" (a high school student) and "Ink-chan" (a mysterious magical girl who arrives to help him with his studying), followed by a set of word examples.

In 2005-3-25, the book was revised with improved grammar, and retitled 'MOETAN Methodology Of English, The Academic Necessity' (もえたん Methodology Of English, The Academic Necessity). This version was published in Korean and Traditional Chinese (Taiwan, Hong Kong).

The Chinese version was published by Min-Hsien Cultural Enterprise Co., Ltd.

Characters
 - Heroine of Moetan. She lives next door to Nao and is infatuated with him.
 - The transformed version of Ink Nijihara, differentiated by the blue hair and duck costume.
 - A well liked but lazy high school student.
 - A magician in the magical kingdom, usually in the form of a duck.
 - A magician in the form of a pencil.
 - A magician in the form of an eraser.
 - A magician in the magical kingdom, usually in the form of a cat.

Voice cast (CD version)
Ink Nijihara: Yukari Tamura
Nao-kun: Yuji Ueda
Ah-kun: Masaya Onosaka

Moetan II
The sequel of Moeru Eitango Moetan was published in two volumes. It includes 1601 words.

Moetan II is available in Chinese (Taiwan, Hong Kong) and Korean (South Korea).

This book is targeted towards serious, tutorial readers.

Characters
Tōya (透也) - Moetan II'''s protagonist.
Yuni (優仁) - Moetan II's heroine.
Chitose (千歳) - Touya and Yuni's classmate.

Moetan subreader
AKA -> (もえたん サブリーダー 〜文法·表現編〜)

Based on previous two books in the Moetan series, it teaches English grammar.

This book is targeted towards casual, tutorial readers.

Moetan 3
AKA -> (もえたん3 魔法少女の帰還〜Return of the Little Witch〜)

This version added poetry and Japanese culture. The book included two stories: Bill and Sam's Excellent Adventure and Return of the Little Witch. Return of the Little Witch was illustrated by POP.

This book is targeted towards casual, entertainment readers.

Chinese version was published on September 9, 2006 by Min-Hsien Cultural Enterprise Co., Ltd.

This book features characters from first Moetan book.

Moetan Online
This is a series of phone applications published by Marvelous Liveware. They are available to i-mode, EZWeb, and SoftBank Mobile users.

Moetan Listening CD

Vol.1
Published in Comic Market 69.

Vol.2
Published in Comic Market 70.

Anime
Bandai Visual, Planet Entertainment, Actas, and Hakuhodo DY Media Partners Incorporated produced a television series based on the book. The TV series premiered on Chiba Television on July 8, 2007, followed by TV Kanagawa, TV Osaka, TV Saitama, and TV Aichi.

Anime characters

The protagonist of Moetan. She lives next door to Nao and is infatuated with him. Even though she is 17 she is often mistaken as a grade-schooler, however she makes up for it with her high grades, especially in English. She meets Ah-kun who gives her the power to transform into the magical hero Pastel Ink; using a pink flip phone, her "magical girl transformation" uses ribbons to censor the "naughty bits". She transforms into a duck-like outfit with blue hair. Using this new power she helps the people of her city while also using it to tutor Nao in English. In episode 12 she has lost her magical abilities but still continues to tutor Nao under her own design of Pastel Ink and gets into the same college as he; she has not yet revealed to him that she is Pastel Ink. Ink's quirks are that she is very clumsy, often tripping over nothing, a trait she seems to have gotten from her mother; and becoming entranced to the point of drooling at the thought of being alone with Nao-kun.

Nao is a well liked but lazy high school student. He is completely oblivious to Ink's and Sumi's feelings for him and in the earlier episodes doesn't even notice them. He has problems with studying English which causes Ink to use her magical form to tutor him at night. He starts to grow closer to Ink but it is not known if he has deeper feelings for her than friendship (though they are seen holding hands at the end of episode 12 & he said he was interested in her in episode 3) and he is unaware that she is Pastel Ink. He likes to play video games, which he sometimes does instead of doing his homework. It was revealed that when Ink went back into the past it was she who got him addicted to video games.

A magician in the magical kingdom, usually in the form of a duck. He is a hopeless pervert with a lolicon fetish and often drools a waterfall when watching Ink change into Pastel Ink; his viewpoint isn't blocked by ribbons. It was revealed that he was framed by Alice as a peeping tom which got him banished to earth in the first place, this being because he couldn't fall in love with her as her breasts were too big. Arc usually acts as the comic relief. His real form is that of a young handsome man with waist long blond hair.

 

Sumi is also in love with Nao and becomes Ink's rival. She is 17 years old even though she looks like a grade-schooler. She is very rich and has a spoiled attitude because of that. Sumi also has a notable love of cats, to the point where she has practically everything in her room in a cat image, even her own nightgown is a large cat suit (with a scrotum). She and Ink were friends when they were younger but for unknown reasons they broke apart (probably because of jealousy since she is horrible at English), even though Ink still tries to be Sumi's friend. A few quirks of hers are that the end of the long strand of hair coming from the front of her head usually portrays what ever she is feeling (!,#, gloved finger pointing); and that she usually falls asleep while studying, which results in her getting hit in the head with a slipper by her maid Ruriko. By the end of the series it seems that her crush for Nao has all but faded and she has started to develop feelings for her magical partner Ka-kun (he has feelings for her as well) and has become good friends with Ink once again. Sumi changes into her magical form Tempera Sumi using a red flip phone, through the use of stars, putting her in a cat style outfit with her hair turned red.

 

A magician in the magical kingdom, usually in the form of a cat. He is Sumi's partner. Even though he also has a lolicon fetish it is nowhere as severe as Arc's. He usually gets a nose bleed when Sumi changes. He originally blames Arc for his banishment, getting into many petty arguments with him, until it is revealed that it was all set up by Alice. At the end of the series he seems to have fallen in love with Sumi and his true form is that of a handsome man with short, spiky black hair.

By day, she's a famous singing idol. By night, she's a magical girl just like Ink. Her partner is a rabbit who is seen shaking all the time. She transforms into a magical girl using a blue flip phone, changing through use of green glowing feathers, to hunt down Ah-kun for "sins" he has committed. She won't forgive Ah-kun and plans to destroy him, but now that Ink is protecting him, things might be difficult for her. It is revealed that Eternal Darkness, the true antagonist of the show, was sealed in her heart until it was broken when Arc cast her aside; having Arc and Ka-kun framed and banished so it would be easier to take over the Magical Kingdom. Alice was saved through the combined efforts of Sumi and Ink and her true form was revealed to be that of a beautiful woman with long green hair and an ample bust. Even though she dislikes Arc's perverted nature she is still in love with him.
 
 

Alice's partner in the form of a stuffed rabbit, who wears a red top hat and constantly shakes. It is revealed in episode 10 that Na-kun is a young girl with the same body structure as Sumi and Ink, whom Arc drools over till being hit by Alice.

 

Sumi's maid. A lovely young woman who always bears a calm smile, yet she is very strict when it comes to Sumi's studies, often hitting her upside the head with a slipper to wake her up. She has a keen eye, not being fooled when Sumi changes into her magical form. Yet even though she is hard on Sumi and not afraid to point out her master's faults, she acts like an older sister. She is very friendly to Ink and refers to Sumi as Ojousama.

 

Nao's younger sister. She appears to have some kind of ability to predict the near future. She is an energetic girl and even though she pretends to be fooled, she can tell that Pastel Ink is Ink. Mio also likes the idea of Ink and her brother as a couple and secretly tries to set them up on dates. In episode 12 it is revealed she too is a Magical Girl named Magical Mio with Dandy as her partner; She transforms using an orange flip phone and changing with hearts, her hair turning blond and wearing a pink dog-like suit. Her powers are uncertain since Dandy defeated the enemy himself. Mio is more brutal to her partner's perverted actions than the other magical girls.

 Ink's classmate. She takes the stereotypical role in a magical girl series as the beautiful girlfriend to Ink. She has long hair and an ample bust. She adores Ink's little girl appearance and hugs her between her large breasts every time she does something cute.
 Ink's classmate. She takes the stereotypical role in a magic girl series as the tomboy to Ink. She is the more level headed of the group and enjoys sports.
 Ink's teacher.
 Ink's mother. A very positive-minded young woman that is only a foot taller than her daughter. She is very clumsy, like her daughter.
Dandy aka Da-kun 

A man wearing a brown trench coat and hat who is seen running from the same police officer in almost every episode (almost like a Zenegata/Lupin relationship). It is never explained why the cop chases Dandy as he is never seen doing anything wrong, and he even helps out Ink every now and again. This has been happening for some time, as in a time travel he was being chased by the same officer, and the officer was seen crying when it appeared that he was unable to arrest Dandy. It is later revealed that he is the King of the Magical Kingdom, and Mio's partner. He turns into the form of a small dog while still wearing his hat, and has a lolicon fetish as well (drooling and having a nose bleed when Mio changes, a combination of Arc and Kaksu's reaction).
 The transformation item used by Ink, Sumi, Mio and Alice in the forms of cell phones.

Episodes

Takayuki Nagatani, a producer of the Moetan moe anime television series, posted on the official series blog that Episode 6 will be replaced by a highlight clips episode in Japan "for various reasons." Episode 6 will be only available on DVD, while Episode 5.5 "Sumi to Ruriko no Moetan Diary" ("Sumi and Ruriko's Moetan Diary") took over its broadcast slot.

Adaptations
Home page of the TV series hosted 4 square comic strip that are updated daily starting from 2007-07-09. 99 strips had been produced.

Beat Net Radio and Lantis web radio hosted Moetan Listening Radio, featuring Sumi and Ruriko.

Lantis sold Moetan audio drama CD on September 9, 2007.

Lantis sold soundtrack CD for the opening and ending songs of the TV show on July 25, 2007 and August 8, 2007 respectively.

Tetsuya Takahashi produced a comic book titled Moetan Magical Busters, please save the world! (もえたん 〜Magical Busters, please save the world!〜), which was serialized in Moetan monthly magazine (もえたん ぷちげっかん) that is bundled with the August 2007 issue of Gamelabo magazine. The cover for the magazine was illustrated by POP. 4 volumes of the comic are planned. The book followed the design and settings of the TV series.

Video games
On August 9, 2007, Techno Quest Inc. published a vertical shooter, based on the Moetan franchise, for Windows XP titled Moetan Shooting (もえたん·しゅ〜てぃんぐ).

Moetan DS

It is a learning video game using design and cast from the TV series.

Preorder include DVD video.

Combat picture book
Hobby Japan published Nijiiro Ink (from MOETAN) and Alice (from Nitro+ games?) as part of Queen's Gate combat picture book game series, which is based on the Lost Worlds game rules.

See also
Edutainment
Moe book
Moegaku

References

External links
Official website
Chinese Moetan page
Chinese Moetan 3 page contains Moetan II'' video
Moetan TV page

POP homepage

Actas
Anime series
Kemonomimi
Magical girl anime and manga
School life in anime and manga
Moe (slang)